Parinari metallica is a tree in the family Chrysobalanaceae. The specific epithet  is from the Latin meaning "metallic", referring to the metallic sheen on the leaves when dried.

Description

Distribution and habitat
Parinari metallica is endemic to Borneo. Its habitat is mixed dipterocarp forests from sea-level to  altitude.

References

metallica
Endemic flora of Borneo
Trees of Borneo
Plants described in 1965